The Overland Express is a 1938 American Western film directed by Drew Eberson and written by Monroe Shaff. The film stars Buck Jones, Marjorie Reynolds, Carlyle Moore Jr., Maston Williams, William Arnold and Lew Kelly. The film was released on April 11, 1938, by Columbia Pictures.

Plot

Cast          
Buck Jones as Buck Dawson
Marjorie Reynolds as Jean Greeley
Carlyle Moore Jr. as Tom Furness
Maston Williams as Bill Hawley 
William Arnold as Henry Furness
Lew Kelly as Fred Greeley
Bud Osborne as Overland Wilson
Ben Taggart as Adams

References

External links
 

1938 films
American Western (genre) films
1938 Western (genre) films
Columbia Pictures films
American black-and-white films
1930s English-language films
1930s American films